Percina carbonaria, the Texas logperch, is a species of freshwater ray-finned fish, a darter from the subfamily Etheostomatinae, part of the family Percidae, which also contains the perches, ruffes and pikeperches.

Geographic distribution
Found only in the Brazos, Colorado, Concho River, Guadalupe and San Antonio River drainages in Texas.

References

carbonaria
Fish described in 1853